Amruka railway station is located in Amruka town of Minchinabad tehsil in Bahawalnagar district, Punjab province, Pakistan.

See also
 List of railway stations in Pakistan
 Pakistan Railways

References

Railway stations in Bahawalpur District
Railway stations on Samasata–Amruka Branch Line